Everjoice Win (born 12 February 1965) is a Zimbabwean feminist activist, and the international head of Action Aid International.

Early life
Everjoice Win was born on 12 February 1965 in Shurugwi, Rhodesia (now Zimbabwe). In 1988, she earned a bachelor's degree in economic history from the University of Zimbabwe.

Career
From 1989 to 1993, Win worked for Women's Action Group.

In 1992, together with Terri Barnes, Win published To Live a Better Life: An Oral History of Women in the City of Harare, 1930-70.

From 1993 to 1997, Win was programme director for the Zimbabwe chapter of Women in Law and Development in Africa (WiLDAF). In 1997, she was one of the founding members of the National Constitutional Assembly of Zimbabwe.

From 2002 to 2003, Win was the spokesperson for the Crisis in Zimbabwe Coalition.

From 2004 to 2007, Win was a board member of the Association of Women's Rights in Development (AWID), in Toronto, Canada.

Win is the international head/ international director of programmes and global engagement for ActionAid International since 2002. She is the International Programmes Director at ActionAid.

Personal life
Win is based in Johannesburg, South Africa.

Publications
 To Live a Better Life: An Oral History of Women in the City of Harare, 1930-70 (Baobab Books, 1992)

References

Living people
Zimbabwean women activists
Zimbabwean feminists
1965 births
University of Zimbabwe alumni
Zimbabwean writers